is a Japanese manga metaseries by Yosuke Takahashi. The story follows the adventures of Mamiya Mugen, a teenage detective from the Showa era Japan, retold in multiple alternate continuities. The second and main series was loosely adapted into an OVA in 1985, while a crowdfunding campaign for a live action film opened in 2015.

Plot
The first manga series introduces Mamiya Mugen, the child heir of a rich family that enjoys solving crimes for the Japanese police during the Showa era. Although young, he has telepathic powers and a keen intellect, and is helped by his faithful butler Alucard. Some of the cases he gets involved with are occult or supernatural in nature.

The series was revamped for the second manga publishing, Boken Katsugeki-hen, where the story remains almost the same, although containing more gags and humor. Mugen lacks any superpower now, and solves cases with the help of his butler Alucard and his love interest Atsuko. However, the shady story of his family intervenes as well, forcing him to confront his villainous father and aunt. This iteration of the series received an OVA whose story conflates and references several of the manga's chapters.

A much more serious, almost horror-oriented view of the series is given in its third continuity, Kaiki-hen, where Mugen is now a suave, distinguished ladies man in his twenties. He works mostly alone and meets a long string of lovers in his cases, but is helped by his spiritual powers and his mentor Professor Yokomizo. This style was kept in the work's fourth version, in which Mamiya has a different set of powers.

The last series is the trilogy Gensho-hen/Oma-hen/Meikyu-hen, in which Mugen is presented as a supernatural entity unrelated to humanity that fights monsters and demons.

Characters

A child detective who solves crimes with his genius mind (and in some continuities, his supernatural powers). He wears a black suit and sometimes a matching bowler hat, and while his personality often changes between series, he is always boyish and quirky. He's 15 in Katsugeki-hen, where he is also a master of disguise and a good shooter. He abandons Japan with the outbreak of World War II, but returns years later, married to Atsuko and having a daughter named Mako.

Mamiya's butler, a huge, bald old man with a surprising strength. Katsugeki-hen reveals he was born in Transylvania and has vampiric blood, but swore loyalty to the Mamiya family after Kyoshiro saved his life during World War I. His name is Dracula backwards.

Mamiya's liaison in the Tokyo Metropolitan Police Department, a bumbling man who often becomes skeptical or cowardly at his plans. His name comes from Edogawa Ranpo.

Introduced in Katsugeki-hen, Atsuko is a girl Mamiya meets during one of his cases, after which she becomes his sidekick. An orphan, she used to earn a living as an exotic dancer in Asakusa. She's intelligent and determined, though quite short-tempered and a bit uncultured. At the end of the series, she marries Mugen and has a daughter with him.

The daughter of Mamiya and Atsuko. During the 1950s, she starts working as a Japanese vigilante named Tokyo Kid.

Mamiya's father, introduced in Katsugeki-hen. He is a professional delinquent, which brings Mamiya troubles to no end, though he sincerely loves his son and wife. At the end of the story, it is revealed that he used to be a friend of Adolf Hitler.

Mamiya's mother, an elegant women constantly infuriated by his husband's antics.

Mamiya's aunt, a beautiful femme fatale murderer.

Another enemy to Mamiya, a Chinese mastermind. He's ostensibly a parody of Fu Manchu, though his face is officially based on popular Japanese actor Akira Oizumi, while his name comes from Charles G. Finney's The Circus of Dr. Lao.

Dr. Lao's main henchman, a plump Chinese man. Though he looks stupid, he can be surprisingly competent. He's a parody of Japanese professional wrestler Thunder Sugiyama.

A scientist who understands psychic abilities. He only appears in the first chapters of Kaiki-hen.

References

External links

1981 manga
1982 manga
1992 manga
2004 manga
1985 anime OVAs
Detective anime and manga
Mystery anime and manga
Shōnen manga